The Women's Slalom in the 2021 FIS Alpine Skiing World Cup consisted of 9 events, as planned.

The battle for the season championship turned into a three-way contest between defending discipline champion Petra Vlhová from Slovakia, six-time discipline champion Mikaela Shiffrin from the USA, and Austrian newcomer Katharina Liensberger, who (at 23) was only two years younger than her established rivals.  Going into the finals in Lenzerheide, Switzerland, after wins by Vlhová and Liensberger in back-to-back slaloms in Åre, Sweden, Vhlová had a 22-point lead on Liensberger and a 37-point lead on Shiffrin, with everyone else at least 180 points behind.  However, in the season final, Liensberger posted the fastest time in both heats to defeat Shiffrin, who finished second, and win both the race and the season championship for the discipline. Liensberger thus became the first Austrian woman to win this discipline since Marlies Schild in 2011.

The season was interrupted by the 2021 World Ski Championships, which were held from 8–21 February in Cortina d'Ampezzo, Italy.  The women's slalom was held on 20 February 2021 (and was also won by Liensberger).

Standings

DNS = Did Not Start
DNF1 = Did Not Finish run 1
DNQ = Did Not Qualify for run 2
DNS2 = Did Not Start run 2
DNF2 = Did Not Finish run 2
DSQ1 = Disqualified run 1
DSQ2 = Disqualified run 2

See also
 2021 Alpine Skiing World Cup – Women's summary rankings
 2021 Alpine Skiing World Cup – Women's Overall
 2021 Alpine Skiing World Cup – Women's Downhill
 2021 Alpine Skiing World Cup – Women's Super-G
 2021 Alpine Skiing World Cup – Women's Giant Slalom
 2021 Alpine Skiing World Cup – Women's Parallel
 World Cup scoring system

References

External links
 Alpine Skiing at FIS website

Women's Slalom
FIS Alpine Ski World Cup slalom women's discipline titles